"First Love" (stylized as "F1rst Love") is a song by French-American singer Uffie. It was released as a single on June 29, 2007, by Ed Banger Records and includes the B-side "Brand New Car" as well as a TV track version of "Brand New Car". Mr. Oizo produced "First Love", using a beat sampled from the 1987 song "Don't Go" by F.R. David, while Feadz produced "Brand New Car". The single peaked at number 18 in Belgium.

Both "First Love" and "Brand New Car" are two of three previously released tracks (the other being "Pop the Glock") that were included on Uffie's debut studio album Sex Dreams and Denim Jeans, which was released on June 14, 2010.

In 2023 the single’s artwork was displayed in the subway station of the Pigalle district in Paris ahead of the Ed Banger ‘XX’ reunion show, featuring Uffie performing alongside her former labelmates for the first time in more than a decade.

Track listing
French 12-inch single
A1. "First Love" – 4:57
B1. "Brand New Car" – 3:18
B2. "Brand New Car" (TV Track) – 3:57

Charts

References

2007 singles
2007 songs
Uffie songs